The 22nd Online Film Critics Society Awards, honoring the best in film for 2018, were announced on January 2, 2019. The nominations were announced on December 26, 2018.

Winners and nominees

Special awards

Technical Achievement Awards
Annihilation – Best Visual EffectsBlack Panther – Best Costume DesignMission: Impossible – Fallout – Best Stunt CoordinationA Quiet Place – Best Sound DesignA Star Is Born – Best Original SongsLifetime Achievement AwardsRoger DeakinsSpike LeeRita MorenoRobert RedfordAgnès Varda'''

Special Achievement Awards
Ryan Coogler for Black Panthers distinctive critical and box office appeal.
The city of Oakland, California, for hosting 2018's most socially and artistically compelling films about racism, Sorry to Bother You and Blindspotting''

Films with multiple nominations and awards

References

2018 film awards
2018